The Lyngholman Nature Reserve is located on Finnøya island in the municipality of Ålesund in Møre og Romsdal county, Norway.

The area received protection in 1988 "to preserve an important wetland area with associated plant communities, bird life and other wildlife," according to the conservation regulations. The bay that the site encompasses has many beach meadows, shallow coves, small islands and large tidal areas. The landscape is undisturbed, and it is hilly with heather fields, marshes, and pastures around the beach meadows. The bay is a nesting ground for waders, and a grazing and overwintering site for other wetland species. It is also a botanical area meriting protection. The area is easily accessible for teaching and research, and there is much outdoor space and a swimming area for summer use.

The reserve is one of six natural areas that were included in the Harøya Wetlands System Ramsar site, which was established in 1996.

References

External links
 Mijlø-direktoratet: Lyngholman. Map and description of the nature reserve.
 Miljøverndepartementet. 1987.  Lyngholman naturreservat, Sandøy kommune, Møre og Romsdal fylke. 1:5,000 map of the nature reserve.
 Forskrift om vern av Lyngholman naturreservat, Sandøy kommune, Møre og Romsdal. 1988.

Nature reserves in Norway
Ramsar sites in Norway
Protected areas of Møre og Romsdal
Ålesund
Protected areas established in 1988